The Asia-Pacific Management Accounting Association (APMAA) was founded in 2004. It is an academic organization that supports members for their research and practices on management accounting about Asia-Pacific region.

Overview 
APMAA was organized by members whose activities and/or research interests relate to management accounting practices in Asia-Pacific region. Therefore, its members are not only from Asia-Pacific region but also from other regions such as Europe, USA, Canada etc.

Objectives 
The Asia-Pacific Management Accounting Association provides a platform for management accounting academics and practitioners mainly in the Asia Pacific region to improve their contribution to global scholarship and to the lives of the people of the region. APMAA accomplishes the above purpose through fostering worldwide connections of communication, learning and sharing of management accounting knowledge in the areas of education, research, and practice.

Annual Conference 
Annual Conferences have been hosted by APMAA, under collaboration with local and national accounting organizations and universities, to enable members to present their research results regularly.

The 2020 Annual Conference was suspended due to the COVID-19 pandemic.
The 2019 Annual Conference was hosted by Qatar University, Qatar.
The 2018 Annual Conference was hosted by APMAA and Waseda University, Tokyo, Japan.
The 2017 Annual Conference was hosted by Shanghai Jiao Tong University, China.
The 2016 Annual Conference was hosted by National Taipei University, Taiwan.
The 2015 Annual Conference was hosted by consortium of 6 universities University of Merdeka Malang, Udayana University, Warmadewa University, Hasanudin University, Mercubuana University and Trisakti University, Indonesia
The 2014 Annual Conference was hosted by Chulalongkorn University, Thailand.
The 2013 Annual Conference was hosted by APMAA Japan.
The 2012 Annual Conference was hosted by University of Xiamen, China.
The 2011 Annual Conference was hosted by Universiti Teknologi MARA, Malaysia.
The 2010 Annual Forum was hosted by National Taiwan University.
The 2009 Annual Forum was hosted by Beppu University, Japan.
The 2007 Annual Forum was hosted by Southwestern University of Finance and Economics, China.
The 2006 Annual Forum was held in Fukuoka, Japan.
The 2004 Annual Forum was held on 24-25, November 2004 in Malaysia.
The 2002 Annual Forum was held on 3 and 4 November in Fukuoka, Japan.

Journal 
The Asia-Pacific Management Accounting Journal (APMAJ) was first published in 2006, two years after establishing the Asia-Pacific Management Accounting Association (APMAA - which is based in Japan), Accounting Research Institute & Faculty of Accountancy (through AMARC) and University Publication Centre (UPENA), Universiti Teknologi MARA (UiTM). Its initial publication in 2006 was once a year but effective 2010, the journal issue was increased to twice a year, respectively in June (Issue 1) and December (Issue 2).), and three times a year (April, August and December) since 2018.

2020 (vol.15)Issue 1(April),Issue 2(August)
2019 (vol.14)Issue 1(April),Issue 2(August),Issue 3(December)
2018 (vol.13)Issue 1(April),Issue 2(August),Issue 3(December)  　 
2017 (vol.12)Issue 1(June),Issue 2(December)
2016 (vol.11)Issue 1(June),Issue 2(December)
2015 (vol.10)Issue 1(June),Issue 2(December)
2014 (vol.9)Issue 1(June),Issue 2(December)
2013 (vol.8)Issue 1(June),Issue 2(December)
2012 (vol.7)Issue 1(June),Issue 2(December)
2011 (vol.6)Issue 1(June),Issue 2(December)
2010 (vol.5)Issue 1(June),Issue 2(December)
2009 (vol.4)Issue 1(June),Issue 2(December)
2008 (vol.3)Issue 1(June)　
2007 (vol.2)Issue 1(December)　
2006 (vol.)Issue 1(December)

APMAA News 
APMAA News is the electronic newsletter of the Asia-Pacific Accounting Association. It is published online three times per year in English. The newsletter reports on relevant APMAA events,  professional activities and announcements involving members and their associates, and other topics relevant to the membership.

References

External links 
 The Asian-Pacific Management Accounting Association
  Asia-Pacific Management Accounting Journal

International accounting organizations